Good Samaritan-Waverly Hospital, also known as “Good Sam” Hospital and Waverly Hospital, is a historic hospital for African-American patients located in Columbia, South Carolina. It was built in 1952, and is a two-story, brick building in the Moderne style. The hospital housed a pharmacy, laboratory, X-ray room, staff dining room, two operating rooms, and 50 beds to service the local community. The hospital closed in August 1973.

It was added to the National Register of Historic Places in 2008. In addition to its National Register of Historic Places status, the Hospital falls within the boundaries of Waverly Protection Area, a Preservation District within the City of Columbia Urban Design and Historic Preservation District system, as well as Waverly Historic District.

References

External links
 

African-American history of South Carolina
Hospital buildings on the National Register of Historic Places in South Carolina
Moderne architecture in South Carolina
Buildings and structures completed in 1952
Hospitals established in 1952
Buildings and structures in Columbia, South Carolina
National Register of Historic Places in Columbia, South Carolina
Historically black hospitals in the United States